The Major Arena Soccer League 3 (MASL3) is a North American indoor soccer league that serves as the developmental league of the Major Arena Soccer League and MASL2.

History 
Established in the summer of 2020, MASL3 is the third tier of indoor soccer in North America under the MASL system. Grand Rapids Wanderers and Muskegon Risers II were the first two member clubs announced with the Omaha Kings FC and Sunflower State FC named the same week. Wichita Wings II and Springfield Demize were also added to the inaugural MASL3 lineup.

With the ongoing COVID-19 pandemic just four teams (Grand Rapids and Muskegon sat out) competed in the inaugural season of 2020–21. Omaha Kings FC finished the six-game regular season unbeaten and went on to capture the Heartland Invitational Cup with victories over Wichita Wings II (11-8) and Sunflower State FC (13-7).

Teams

Inactive teams 
FC Wichita

Grand Rapids Wanderers

Muskegon Risers II

Sunflower State FC

Former teams 
Des Moines United FC (2021–22) - rebranded as Iowa Demon Hawks and moved to MASL2

Omaha Kings FC (2020–21) - moved to MASL2

Skyline City CF (2021–22)

Springfield Demize (2020–22) - moved to MLIS

Champions

References

External links 
 MASL3 website

Indoor soccer leagues in the United States
Soccer leagues in the United States
2020 establishments in the United States
Sports leagues established in 2020